Tukangbesi Islands, is a group of islands off the coast of Sulawesi immediately east of Buton island in the Banda Sea region, and part of Sulawesi Tenggara. "Tukang Besi" literally means "iron worker" or "blacksmith" in Indonesian. There is a Tukang Besi language.  Separating Buton and the group is the Gulf of Kolowana Watabo.

Islands in the group:
 Wakatobi Islands
 Northwest:  Wangiwangi Island, Kambode, Kampenane, Timor
 North Central: Kaledupa, Hoga, Linea Island,
 South Central: Tomea, Talondano, Lineta, Binongko
 Eastern outliers: Moromaho, Cowocowo, Kentiole, Runduma, Anano
 Western atolls. Karang Kapota, Karang Kaledupa 
 Eastern atolls: Karang Koromaha, Karang Kadupa
 Langkesi islands (Kepulauan Langkesi) so the northeast.

The town of Papalia is on Binongko.

See also

 Wakatobi National Park

 
Archipelagoes of Indonesia
Islands of Sulawesi
Landforms of Southeast Sulawesi
Populated places in Indonesia